The Dominion of Ceylon competed at the 1962 British Empire and Commonwealth Games in Perth, Western Australia, from 22 November to 1 December 1962.

Boxing

Wrestling

Key:
  - Victory by Fall.
  - Decision by Points - the loser with technical points.
  - Decision by Points - the loser without technical points.

See also
 Ceylon at the 1960 Summer Olympics
 Ceylon at the 1964 Summer Olympics

References

1962
Nations at the 1962 British Empire and Commonwealth Games
British Empire and Commonwealth Games